Matt McCoy (born May 20, 1958) is an American actor. His credits include The Hand that Rocks the Cradle, Police Academy 5: Assignment Miami Beach and Police Academy 6: City Under Siege as Sgt. Nick Lassard, DeepStar Six as Jim Richardson, in L.A. Confidential as Brett Chase, and as Lloyd Braun on TV's Seinfeld.

Early life
McCoy was born in Austin, Texas. He grew up in Bethesda, Maryland, and attended Walter Johnson High School, graduating in 1974. McCoy briefly attended University of Maryland, College Park. He worked briefly at the Harlequin Dinner Theater in Rockville. McCoy began acting when he appeared in two plays in the student-directed one act festival: Winners by Brian Friel, and Footsteps of Doves by Robert Anderson.  Moving to New York City, he graduated from Neighborhood Playhouse School of the Theatre in 1979.

Career
Since starring as Sgt. Nick Lassard in Police Academy 5: Assignment Miami Beach (1988) and Police Academy 6: City Under Siege (1989), his motion picture credits have included White Wolves: A Cry in the Wild II (1993), the Curtis Hanson films The Hand That Rocks the Cradle (1992) and L.A. Confidential (1997), as well as the action comedy National Security (2003) alongside Martin Lawrence and Steve Zahn.

He has worked regularly on television. His credits include starring in the sitcom We Got It Made, and guest appearances on The Love Boat; Murder, She Wrote; Star Trek: The Next Generation; The Golden Girls; The Nanny; L.A. Law; Melrose Place; NYPD Blue; Chicago Hope; Sabrina, the Teenage Witch; Six Feet Under; The West Wing; Carnivàle; CSI: NY, Silicon Valley; True Detective; Studio 60 on the Sunset Strip; Reba and Huff. He played Lloyd Braun in two episodes of Seinfeld. He appeared in three Bigfoot-themed movies: Bigfoot: The Unforgettable Encounter (1994), Little Bigfoot (1997) and Abominable (2006).

In 2014, McCoy began appearing as a spokesperson in commercials for The Hartford Insurance Company, identified as a customer on the "compensated endorser" principle. He once again appeared as a spokesperson in The Hartford commercials in 2019, these commercials directed towards AARP members; and in 2021, he was joined by his real-life wife Mary for at least one ad.

Filmography

Film

Television

Video

References

External links

 
 Matt McCoy profile, tv.msn.com; accessed February 16, 2015. 
 Matt McCoy at TV.com

1958 births
20th-century American male actors
21st-century American male actors
American male film actors
American male television actors
Living people
Male actors from Austin, Texas
Male actors from Maryland
Male actors from Washington, D.C.
Neighborhood Playhouse School of the Theatre alumni
People from Bethesda, Maryland
University of Maryland, College Park alumni